The 1957–58 Washington Huskies men's basketball team represented the University of Washington for the 1957–58 NCAA University Division basketball season. Led by eighth-year head coach Tippy Dye, the Huskies were members of the Pacific Coast Conference and played their home games on campus at Hec Edmundson Pavilion in Seattle, Washington.

References

External links
Sports Reference – Washington Huskies: 1957–58 basketball season

Washington Huskies men's basketball seasons
Washington Huskies
Washington
Washington